Football (soccer) at the Pan American Games has been included in every Pan American Games as a men's competition sport, since the first edition of the multi-sports event in 1951. The competition is organized by the Pan American Sports Organization.

So as to avoid competition with the World Cup, FIFA have restricted participation of elite players in the men's tournament in various ways. Currently squads for the men's tournament are required to be composed of players under 22 years of age.

The tournament was played in league format from 1951 to 1963, neither final nor bronze medal match hosted. Another format was used in 1971, this time the tournament was played in group format in early stages, but played in league format for final stages. The 1983 tournament saw only 3 teams played in the final group stages, with the first and final time the tournament did not have the fourth place team.

A women's tournament was introduced in 1999.

Men's tournament

Summaries 

Notes

Performances by countries 

* = host

Participating nations

Teams participate with their U-22 squads. In some cases such as in 1951 (for Venezuela and Costa Rica) some countries sent their full squad (including players over the age of 22).

Women's tournament

Summaries

Performances by countries 

* = host

Participating nations

Medal table

References

External links 
 Panamerican Games overview at the RSSSF

Football at the Pan American Games
Sports at the Pan American Games
Pan American Games